Lee R. Denney is a politician from the U.S. state of Oklahoma. Elected in 2005, she currently represents district 33 in the Oklahoma House of Representatives and is speaker pro tempore of the House. During her time in office, she has been the primary author of 204 bills. She previously served as mayor and vice-mayor of Cushing, OK, and has been a co-owner of Veterinary Medical Associates, Inc. since 1979.

Early life
Born in Cushing, OK in 1953, Denney was a middle child, with an older sister and a younger brother. Her mother stayed at home and her father worked in the insurance business.

Education
Denney graduated from Cushing High School in 1971. She then entered Oklahoma State University, where she received a bachelor's degree in agricultural economics in 1976. She received her doctorate of veterinary medicine in 1978.

Career
In 1979, Denney became co-owner of Veterinary Medical Associates, Inc. She has been involved in her community in many capacities, including serving as city commission mayor and vice-mayor of Cushing, OK from 1994–2003. From 1995–2004, she served on the Board of Veterinary Medical Examiners. She is currently a member of the Oklahoma Veterinary Medical Association and the American Veterinary Medical Association.

House of Representatives (2004–2016)
Denney was elected to the Oklahoma House of Representatives in 2004 and served until 2016, when the term limit was reached. Over 12 years, she authored 204 bills and served as the speaker pro tempore. She was recently appointed to the Oklahoma Commission on the Status of Women by the Oklahoma House of Representatives.

Past committees
A&B common education (chair)
Appropriations and budget
Common education
Conference committee on common education
Conference committee on energy and aerospace
Conference committee on higher education and careertech
Energy and aerospace
General conference committee on appropriations
Joint committee on appropriations and budget

Denney currently serves as the ex officio member on all House committees.

Leadership
Assistant majority floor leader
Speaker pro tempore (2015–present)

Awards and honors
Leadership Oklahoma Class VII
Journal Record – 50 Women Making a Difference (1997, 2003 & 2008)
OK State Regents for Higher Ed - Distinguished Service Award (2009 & 2011)
Bill Lowry Library Champion Award (2008 & 2011)
New Oklahoma Legislator of the Year (2006)
Honorary Co-Chair of Girl Scout Troop 1912

References

Further reading

Women of the Oklahoma Legislature Oral History Project -- OSU Library

1953 births
People from Cushing, Oklahoma
Oklahoma State University alumni
Women state legislators in Oklahoma
Republican Party members of the Oklahoma House of Representatives
Living people
21st-century American politicians
21st-century American women politicians